Kimberly A. Crider is a retired United States Air Force major general who last served as the mobilization assistant to the Chief of Space Operations of the United States Space Force. Concurrently, she was also the chief technology and innovation officer of the Space Force. Prior to serving in her last position, she was the Air Force Chief Data Officer.

Awards and decorations

References 

Living people
Year of birth missing (living people)
Place of birth missing (living people)
Recipients of the Legion of Merit
United States Air Force generals
Major generals